Kim Chang-Hee  (born 5 December 1986) is a South Korean football midfielder.

Another player called Kim Chang-Hee (born 8 June 1987) also played in the K-League around the same time as this one, for Gangwon FC.

Club career
Kim Chang-hee was drafted from Konkuk University for Daegu FC's 2009 season.  He played a limited role in the season, participating in 11 games during the 2009 K-League.  After failing to feature at all during the 2010 season, Kim was released.  He subsequently joined Daejeon KHNP, who play in the Korea National League, the semi-professional football tier below the K-League.

Club career statistics

External links 

1986 births
Living people
Association football midfielders
South Korean footballers
Daegu FC players
Daejeon Korail FC players
K League 1 players
Korea National League players